Surjit Singh Majithia (1912-1995) was an Indian politician, diplomat and air force officer. He was elected to the Lok Sabha, the lower house of the Parliament of India from the Tarn Taran  constituency of  Punjab  as a member of the Indian National Congress.

Biography
Majithia was born into the prominent Sher-Gill Jatt Sikh landholding Majithia family. His father was Sundar Singh Majithia who served in the Punjab government.

Majithia was commissioned a pilot officer in the flying branch of the Indian Air Force Volunteer Reserve on 8 November 1939, two months after the start of the Second World War. He rose to command a fighter squadron until he left the Air Force in 1944 to pursue a political career. From 1945 to 1947, he was member of Central Legislative Assembly, served on the Defence Consultative Committee and was principal of Khalsa College, Amritsar. After independence in 1947, he was promoted to honorary wing commander in the (Royal) Indian Air Force and appointed ambassador to the neighbouring country of Nepal, where he remained until 1949.

He was also President of Board of Control for Cricket in India and Wrestling Federation of India; Vice-president of National Rifle Association of India and President of All India Tennis Association.

See also
 Majithia Sirdars

References

External links
 Official biographical sketch in Parliament of India website

1912 births
1995 deaths
Indian National Congress politicians
Lok Sabha members from Punjab, India
India MPs 1952–1957
India MPs 1957–1962
India MPs 1962–1967
Indian Air Force officers
Ambassadors of India to Nepal
Union deputy ministers of India
Indian cricket administrators
Presidents of the Board of Control for Cricket in India
People from Tarn Taran district
Punjabi people
Indian Sikhs
Indian military personnel of World War II
Military personnel from Punjab, India
Indian National Congress politicians from Punjab, India